Eugeniusz Olszyna (born 10 February 1954, Poznań – died 5 March 2023, Gniezno) was a Polish footballer who played as a striker.

The majority of his career was at his hometown city clubs. Starting at Warta before moving to Lech in 1971.

His career high came between 1974 and 1976, noting 39 appearances and 3 goals in the Ekstraklasa. He ended his career at Mieszko Gniezno.

References

Footballers from Poznań
Polish footballers
Association football forwards
Mieszko Gniezno players
Lech Poznań players
Warta Poznań players
Ekstraklasa players
1954 births
2023 deaths